Muthyala Stephen Raveendra(ముత్యాల స్టీఫెన్ రవీంద్ర ) (born 14 February 1973) is the present Police commissioner of Cyberabad Metropolitan Police since from 25 August 2021.  He was earlier, Inspector General of Police of West Zone (Hyderabad and Nizamabad Ranges) also holding full additional charge as Deputy Inspector General of Police (Hyderabad Range)

Raveendra is a 1999 batch Regular Recruit (52RR) of the Indian Police Service who got trained at the Sardar Vallabhbhai Patel National Police Academy, Hyderabad, India and was inducted into the IPS on 20 September 1999. Raveendra was the West Zone Deputy Commissioner of Police, Hyderabad City Police. and was DIG in the elite special forces of Greyhounds.  In 2015, Raveendra was a resource person at the Strategic Gaming Exercise on Left Wing Extremism held by the United Service Institution, New Delhi.

Early life, schooling and collegiate studies
Officer Raveendra is the son of an illustrious Police Officer DSP M. B. Ranjit who earlier retired as the Assistant Commissioner of Police, Asifnagar Division, Hyderabad City Police.  Raveendra was schooled at St. Paul's High School, Little Flower Junior College and Nizam College, all in Hyderabad.  He passed out of Nizam College in 1994 and then entered the portals of Department of Zoology at the University College of Science, Osmania University.  There were learned Entomologists comprising Professors S.S.Thakur, B. Julius Divakar, P. Judson, B. Kishen Rao and others.  Stephen was enthused by Entomology and specialized in it and passed out of the learned portals of the University in 1996.

After post-graduate studies at Department of Zoology, Osmania University where he received a gold medal in Zoology, he cleared the Union Public Service Commission entrance and opted for IPS and underwent training at the Sardar Vallabhai Patel National Police Academy, Hyderabad.

Career 
Raveendra's initial posting was in Warangal District where he was groomed by Damodar Gautam Sawang, then the Deputy Inspector General of Police, Warangal Range.  Incidentally, Noel Swaranjit Sen happened to be the Director General and Inspector General of Police of Andhra Pradesh when Raveendra was in Warangal District. The colleagueship of Swaranjit-Sawang-Stephen helped in containing the terrorist tactics of Naxalites.

In the past sometime in 2019, it was indicated that Stephen Raveendra has been tipped to be the new Intelligence Chief of Andhra Pradesh w.e.f 30 May.  Moves by the incumbent Chief Minister, Y. S. Jaganmohan Reddy to his neighbouring counterpart, K. Chandrashekar Rao point towards this direction and steps seem to have been made at the Centre to quickly move the files and get the Officer on deputation from Telangana to Andhra Pradesh.

Achievements 
So far in Raveendra's career he has encountered Naxalism (as SP-in-Warangal), Factionalism (as SP-in-Anantapur), Corruption (as SP-in-Karimnagar), Regionalism (as DCP-in-East Zone) and eradicated drugs from Hyderabad city. (as DCP-in-West Zone)

The areas under the jurisdiction of West Zone are in the news due to frequent arrests of persons possessing drugs. The problem of drugs is under current debate so much that the former Commissioner of Police, A. K. Khan, even addressed a seminar conducted at the Centre for Economic Studies in Hyderabad on the topic "War on Drugs" where Officer Raveendra was also present .Mr.Raveendra in a dare-devil act of self-less courage saved the lives of 61 patients who were trapped in a fire accident in a hospital for which he was awarded the prestigious Prime Minister's Life saving Medal. Likewise, he was awarded Gallantry medal for high-risk anti-extremist operations.

Parallels may be drawn between the colleagueship of Commissioner of Police A. K. Khan and Deputy Commissioner of Police Raveendra to Mumbai's then Commissioner of Police Julio Francis Ribeiro and Deputy Commissioner of Police Y. C. Pawar who also waged a war on drugs during their tenures in the mid eighties.

References

1973 births
Living people
Indian police chiefs
People from Hyderabad, India
Indian Baptists
Indian Christians
Telugu people
Indian Police Service officers
Convention of Baptist Churches of Northern Circars